Pompoir is a sexual technique in which the woman uses her vaginal muscles to stimulate the man's penis. Both partners remain still, while the woman strokes the man's erection using rhythmic, rippling pulses of the pubococcygeus muscles, so this practice is best performed in a woman on top position.

Performing Kegel or pelvic floor exercises can increase a woman's skill in pompoir by strengthening the relevant muscles, and allow her to identify, and isolate, individual muscles, to contract them in turn to provide the rippling sensation.

Other names for this technique include the Singapore grip. The title of The Singapore Grip, a novel by J. G. Farrell, as well as its 2020 television adaptation, refers to this phrase.

Kabzah
"Kabzah" or "Kabza" is a variant technique that originates from South Asia, where the female additionally uses her abdominal muscle contractions to stimulate the penis of the male partner, who must remain totally passive. The word translates as "holder", and the sensation can be likened to that of "milking". Women are reported to have spent many years in training before becoming proficient in this technique, and as such this technique is considered highly difficult to perform. The act itself is a variety of tantra, its purpose being to enhance and increase the duration and intensity of intercourse.

History

It is a millenary technique of the East. It originated in India and was perfected in Thailand. The first exercises came with a transformation of the extensive preparatory tantric exercises for the Maithuna. This transformation was initially developed by the priestesses of the Great Mother temples to be used in fertility rituals. With time the technique expanded and became increasingly popular. 

A similar exercise was developed in the 1950s by gynecologist Arnold Kegel, who in 1952 developed some exercises for women who had a problem with urinary incontinence. With the research he discovered that the pubococcygeus muscle was out of shape and not working properly. By exercising these muscles, the medical problem was solved and the potential for genital sensations and orgasm increased.
In part this was due to blood flow increasing in exercised muscles, and the increase in blood flow is related to the ease of arousal and orgasm. When the strength of a muscle increases, the blood supply increases, with the side effect being an increase of blood flow to the pelvis resulting in higher levels of arousal and more intense orgasms.

References

Further reading
 Kadosh, Carlos, Celine Kirei (2015) Pompoir - The Path of Pleasure - Health, Sexuality and Quality of Life. Eden Publishing 
 Kadosh, Carlos, (2015) Male Sexual Potency - Pompoir - The Kama Sutra`s Gymnastic. Eden Publishing 

Sexual acts